Muhammad Rachman (born 23 December 1971) is an Indonesian professional boxer. An over twenty-year veteran of the sport, he is a two-time minimumweight world champion, having held the IBF title from 2004 to 2007 and the WBA title in 2011.

Professional career

"The Rock Breaker" (Rachman's nickname) won the IBF World Strawweight Championship by a split decision against Daniel Reyes of Colombia (September 14, 2004 in Jakarta).  Rachman got his nickname "The Rock Breaker" after defeating Filippino IBF high-rated Ernesto "Hard Rock" Rubillar, in Jakarta, Indonesia, in March 2003.

On July 7, 2007, Rachman lost his title to Filipino boxer Florante Condes. Condes knocked Rachman down twice in the third and 10th rounds during the 12-round title fight held in the studio of the private RCTI television station in Jakarta. Rachman dominated the fight in rounds four, six, seven, eight, and nine. Whereas Condes dominated the fight in rounds one, two, three, five, and ten. Salven Lagumbay of the Philippines and Montol Suriyachand of Thailand, scored it 114-112 for Condes, while home judge Muhammad Rois gave it 117-113 for Rachman.

On 19 April 2011 Rachman knocked out Thai boxer Kwanthai Sithmorseng in the 9th round at Thailand to claim the WBA World Minimumweight title. Rachman was knocked down in the second round but stunned Sithmorseng in the 9th round when he knocked down him with a huge body blow.

On July 30, 2011, Rachman lost the WBA World Minimumweight title to Pornsawan Porpramook in a controversial majority decision, 114-114, 113-115, 114-115.

Rachman is recorded as the fourth Indonesian to win a boxing world title belt, following Ellyas Pical (three-time IBF Jr. Bantamweight Champion, 1985- 1989), Nico Thomas (IBF Strawweight Champion, 1989) and Chris John (WBA Featherweight Champion, 2003-2013).

Personal life
In 2006, Rachman became a law student at Putra Bangsa University, Indonesia.

Professional boxing record

See also
List of Mini-flyweight boxing champions

References

External links
 

1971 births
Living people
Indonesian Muslims
People from Merauke Regency
Mini-flyweight boxers
World mini-flyweight boxing champions
International Boxing Federation champions
World Boxing Association champions
Indonesian male boxers